Interstate 680 (I-680) in Nebraska and Iowa is the northern bypass of the Omaha–Council Bluffs metropolitan area. I-680 spans  from its southern end in western Omaha, Nebraska, to its eastern end near Crescent, Iowa. The freeway passes through a diverse range of scenes and terrains—the urban setting of Omaha, the Missouri River and its valley, the rugged Loess Hills, and the farmland of Pottawattamie County, Iowa.

From 1973 until 2019, I-680 extended much farther into Iowa. It then headed east along what is now known as I-880 until it met I-80 again near Neola. The I-880 section was originally known as I-80N from 1966 until it was absorbed into I-680 in 1973. I-680 in Omaha was originally designated Interstate 280 (I-280). Maps from the early and mid-1960s showed I-280 in Omaha. Since this highway would extend into Iowa and I-280 was already planned for the Quad Cities area, this route was redesignated I-680.

Route description

I-680 begins at a complex interchange with I-80 in Omaha. Due to the proximity of the West Center Road interchange on I-680 and the I, L, and Q street interchanges on I-80, all the exit and entrance ramps which connect I-80 to I-680 also connect to West Center Road and I, L, and Q streets. The freeway heads north through the heart of West Omaha; it serves as a dividing line of several residential neighborhoods.  north of West Center Road, which, prior to 2003, was Nebraska Highway 38 (N-38), is a new interchange with US Route 6 (US 6), known as Dodge Street in Omaha. Another mile north of Dodge Street is N-64, known as Maple Street.

At N-133, I-680 turns to the east toward Iowa. I-680 crosses over N-36, which is accessed via the US 75 interchange  later. US 75 runs adjacent to I-680 for  before turning south at 30th Street. The Interstate crosses the Missouri River to Iowa via the Mormon Bridge. In Iowa, I-680 is markedly less urban than in Nebraska. The first  of I-680 travel through the flat bottoms of the Missouri River valley. I-680 ends at an interchange with I-29 just west of Crescent.

History

In Nebraska, plans for I-280 to bypass Omaha to the north to I-29 were drawn up in the late 1950s. At the same time, plans were being drawn up for an I-280 to bypass the Quad Cities. Since two Interstates cannot have the same designation in the same state, one of the I-280s had to be renumbered. The Omaha I-280 was redesignated as I-680 around 1965. In Iowa, I-80N opened to traffic on December 13, 1966. I-80N extended from the current northern interchange with I-29 near Loveland to the I-80 interchange near Neola.

In the early 1970s, the American Association of State Highway and Transportation Officials (AASHTO) decided that Interstates with a directional suffix, such as I-80N, would have to be renumbered. By 1974, I-80N had been redesignated to I-680 to match Nebraska. The last piece of I-680 to be completed in Nebraska was the westbound bridge across the Missouri River. Paving in Iowa wrapped up in the years to come and the entire route was open to traffic by April 21, 1979.

2011 flooding

Over the course of several months in 2011, I-680 was severely damaged by flood waters from the Missouri River. The first sections of both I-680 and I-29 closed on June 10. I-29 was closed from North 25th Street to the northern I-680 interchange near Loveland. I-680 was closed from US 75 in Omaha to the southern interchange with I-29. A week later, water was diverted and drained from the area around the northern I-29 interchange to allow traffic to use the roads. I-680 was opened from the interchange to the Beebeetown exit and I-29 was reopened from the interchange to the US 30 exit at Missouri Valley. I-29 traffic was routed around the flooded area by using I-680 eastbound to I-80 westbound to Council Bluffs.

After floodwaters receded and the damage was assessed, sections of I-680 were reopened to traffic. However, the section west of I-29 was the most heavily damaged and it remained closed. Contract bids were let on September 23, and reconstruction began on September 28. Construction crews worked at "an accelerated pace" to complete the road in 34 days. The road was officially reopened on November 2 during a ceremony in Crescent hosted by Governor Terry Branstad.

Exit list

See also
North Omaha, Nebraska
History of North Omaha, Nebraska
Timeline of North Omaha, Nebraska history
Landmarks in North Omaha, Nebraska

References

External links

The Iowa Highways Page by Jason Hancock
Photo gallery of 2011 flooding and reconstruction of I-680

Expressways in the Omaha area
Transportation in Omaha, Nebraska
80-6 Iowa-Nebraska
80-6
80-6
6 Iowa-Nebraska
Transportation in Douglas County, Nebraska
Transportation in Pottawattamie County, Iowa